Keime Helfrich (born 5 September 1997) is a Dutch basketball player for Heroes Den Bosch of the BNXT League.

Early life
After playing for the club Pigeons in Duiven, Helfrich entered the youth academy of Landstede Basketbal.

Professional career
Helfrich made his professional debut for Landstede Basketbal in the 2015–16 season. As an occasional member of the Landstede roster, he appeared in 14 games over three seasons. After this, he played two seasons for Promotiedivisie club Dreamfield Dolphins.

On 21 August 2020, Helfrich signed with Yoast United, marking his return to the first tier Dutch Basketball League. He averaged 12.4 points and 4.3 rebounds in the 2020–21 season with Yoast.

On 1 June 2021, Helfrich signed a 3-year contract with Heroes Den Bosch.

References

External links
Keime Helfrich at Proballers

1997 births
Living people
Dutch men's basketball players
Heroes Den Bosch players
Landstede Hammers players
Small forwards
Yoast United players